The 1974 Campeonato Paulista da Divisão Especial de Futebol Profissional, organized by the Federação Paulista de Futebol, was the 73rd season of São Paulo's top professional football league. Palmeiras won the championship by the 17th time, becoming the greatest champion of São Paulo, remaining in that position until 1982, when Corinthians won their 18th title and surpassed the rival in state achievements. In this opportunity the runner-up was the Corinthians team, who had already been for twenty years without winning the Paulista title. no teams were relegated and the top scorer was Botafogo's Geraldão with 23 goals.

Championship
Much like in the previous year, a preliminary phase was disputed before the championship proper, in which all teams played against each other twice and the seven best teams qualified into the main championship. That phase was to be disputed in the second semester of 1973, by all of the teams that had disputed that phase in the previous year, with the exception of Juventus, and with the addition of three guests - Nacional, Rio Preto and Saad. Out of these, Saad would be the only one to be invited again in the next year.

The championship proper was divided into two rounds, in which each team played against each other once, and the winner of each round qualified to the Finals.

Preliminary round

League table

Results

First round

League table

Results

Second round

League table

Results

Finals

|}

Top Scores

References

Campeonato Paulista seasons
Paulista